Joe Hargreaves (1915-1992) was an English footballer who played as a forward for Rossendale United, Rochdale and Stalybridge Celtic.

In the 1945-46 season he scored 6 goals in 6 matches for Rochdale in the F.A. Cup, and was also a prolific goalscorer in the final wartime league season.

In the 1946-47 season, he was leading lead goalscorer for Rochdale.

References

1915 births
1992 deaths
English footballers
Association football forwards
Rochdale A.F.C. players
Rossendale United F.C. players
Stalybridge Celtic F.C. players
English Football League players